Rosalind von Schirach (21 April 1898 in Berlin – 1981 in Munich) was a German opera singer, mainly known as a lyric soprano.

From 1920 to 1925 she performed under the pseudonym Rosa Lind at the Leipzig Opera. From 1925 to 1928 she performed as Rosa Lind as a coloratura soprano at the National Theatre Mannheim. She later performed as a lyric soprano under her real name Rosalind von Schirach from 1930 to 1935 at the Deutsche Oper Berlin. She performed at the Royal Opera House in London in 1935.

She was the daughter of the theatre director Carl von Schirach and his American wife Emma Middleton Lynah Tillou, and a member of the noble Sorbian Schirach family. Her brother was the Nazi youth leader Baldur von Schirach; Rosalind von Schirach did not share her brother's Nazi views, and her career declined during the Nazi era.

References 

German operatic sopranos
Rosalind
German people of American descent
German people of Sorbian descent
German untitled nobility
1898 births
1981 deaths
Singers from Berlin
20th-century German  women opera singers